Onaolapo Soleye is a Nigerian scholar and former Minister of Finance during the military regime of General Muhammadu Buhari. He served for (20) twenty months as the minister of finance. He was also a former commissioner for Finance and Industry in Ogun State. He sits on the board of the Obasanjo Presidential Library. 

He was a former lecturer at the university of Ibadan, he was also the commissioner of industry in the western region before he was appointed as the minister of finance. 

Soleye preferred administrative controls on foreign exchange, he rejected proposals to drastically devalue naira. He also decided to print new notes in April 1984, to prevent the repratriation of Naira through smuggling.

Education
Dr Soleye attended Baptist Boys' High School, Abeokuta, one of the earliest secondary school established in Nigeria. He trained as a Sociologist and studied at the London School of Economics and Political Science and University of Manchester.

Soleye's major policy actions during his tenure as Minister of Finance include:
Policies preventing drastic devaluation of the Naira
Refinancing of trade debt arrears insured by international organizations
Supported the rationalization and restriction of imports
Did not stop the trend of budget deficit financing
Creating of new Naira notes to halt currency smuggling

References
"Obasanjo Farms Withdraws From Okitipupa Oil Palm Board", Daily Trust, January 21, 2002

Living people
Finance ministers of Nigeria
Yoruba politicians
Academic staff of the University of Ibadan
Alumni of the University of Manchester Institute of Science and Technology
Alumni of the London School of Economics
Baptist Boys' High School alumni
Year of birth missing (living people)